Teri Ann Manolio is an American physician, epidemiologist, and geneticist. She is director of the Division of Genomic Medicine at the National Human Genome Research Institute (NHGRI), as well as Professor of Medicine at the Uniformed Services University of the Health Sciences. She is a fellow of the American College of Physicians and of the American Heart Association's Council on Epidemiology. She also has a clinical appointment at the Walter Reed National Military Medical Center in Bethesda, Maryland. Before joining the NHGRI, she worked on large cohort studies, such as the Cardiovascular Health Study and the Framingham Heart Study, at the National Heart, Lung, and Blood Institute.

References

American women epidemiologists
American epidemiologists
American geneticists
Genetic epidemiologists
American women physicians
American women geneticists
University of Maryland, College Park alumni
University of Maryland, Baltimore alumni
Johns Hopkins Bloomberg School of Public Health alumni
National Institutes of Health faculty
Uniformed Services University of the Health Sciences faculty
People from Bethesda, Maryland
Year of birth missing (living people)
Living people
American women academics
21st-century American women